Funes is a Spanish surname that may refer to:


People
Louis de Funès, French actor
Mauricio Funes, President of El Salvador
Matías Funes, Honduran academic and politician
Ramiro Funes Mori, Argentine football player
Rogelio Funes Mori, Argentine football player

Places
Funes, Navarra, Spain
Funes, Santa Fe, Argentina
Funes, Nariño, Colombia
The Italian name for Villnöß, South Tyrol, Italy

Literature
"Funes the Memorious", a short story by Jorge Luis Borges

See also